2014–15 Andebol 1 is a season of the Portuguese Handball First Division.

Regular season

Standings

Pld - Played; W - Won; L - Lost; GF - Goals for; GA - Goals against; Diff - Difference; Pts - Points.

Number of teams by Region

References

2014 in Portuguese sport
2014–15 domestic handball leagues
2015 in Portuguese sport
Handball in Portugal